The table below lists the judgments of the Constitutional Court of South Africa delivered in 2004.

The members of the court at the start of 2004 were Chief Justice Arthur Chaskalson, Deputy Chief Justice Pius Langa, and judges Tholie Madala, Yvonne Mokgoro, Dikgang Moseneke, Sandile Ngcobo, Kate O'Regan, Albie Sachs and Zak Yacoob. The seats left vacant by the retirement of Lourens Ackermann and Richard Goldstone in late 2003 were filled in February by the appointment of Thembile Skweyiya and Johann van der Westhuizen.

References
 
 

2004
Constitutional Court
Constitutional Court of South Africa